Cleopatra is the second studio album by American indie folk band the Lumineers. The album was released in the United States on April 8, 2016, and contains the singles "Ophelia", "Cleopatra", "Angela" and "Sleep on the Floor". The album received positive reviews and commercial success, debuting at number one on the UK Albums Chart and the Billboard 200. It is the last album by the band to feature Neyla Pekarek, who left in October 2018 to pursue a solo career.

The cover is a photograph of actress Theda Bara.

Critical reception
Cleopatra received positive reviews. At Metacritic, the album received an average score of 67. PopMatters gave the album 60 points, saying : "If the Lumineers debut record was a representation of their metaphorical college years, Cleopatra is definitely their more mature, but confused, post-grad understanding of fame".

The Ballad of Cleopatra compilation music video 
The Ballad of Cleopatra is a compilation of the story in the music videos for Ophelia, Cleopatra, Sleep on the Floor, Angela and My Eyes, all songs from the album Cleopatra. The video was released on the Lumineers YouTube channel on April 27, 2017. As of January 28th, 2023 it has over 50 million views.

Track listing

Personnel 
Credits adapted from Cleopatra liner notes.

The Lumineers

Wesley Schultz – lead vocals (all tracks except 11), guitar (all tracks except 11), percussion (track 2, 3)
Jeremiah Fraites – drums (all tracks except 8, 9, 11, 13), percussion (all tracks except 8, 9, 11, 12, 13, 14), piano (all tracks except 8, 9, 12, 13, 14), keyboards (track 9, 14)
Neyla Pekarek – cello (track 1, 3, 4, 5, 7, 10, 12, 13, 14), vocals (track 1, 2, 3, 4, 5, 7, 12, 14)

Additional Musicians

 Byron Isaacs – bass guitar (all tracks except 7, 8, 9, 11, 13, 14), background vocals (track 1, 2, 4, 5, 10)
 Simon Felice – percussion (all tracks except 6, 8, 9, 11, 12), background vocals (track 2, 4)
 David Baron – keyboards (track 1, 7, 8, 9, 11)
 Lauren Jacobson – strings (track 1, 4, 5, 7, 9, 10), violin (track 8), background vocals (track 2, 4)
 Rick Mullen – guitar technique
Abraham Hovey – guitar (track 12)

Artwork

The Kobal Collection – photography
Daniel Quay – layout

Production

 Simone Felice – production (all tracks except 13, 14)
 Jesse O'Brien  – production (track 13, 14), recording (track 13, 14)
 Bod Ludwig – mastering
 Ryan Hewitt – mixing, recording (all tracks except 13, 14)
 Chad Cuttill – mixing assistance (all tracks except 13, 14)

Recording

 Recorded at Clubhouse Recording Studios
 Mixed at House of Blues Studios, Nashville, TN
 Mastered at Gateway Mastering

Charts

Weekly charts

Year-end charts

Certifications

References

The Lumineers albums
Dualtone Records albums
2016 albums